George "Gino" Washington (born 1946?) is an American singer from Detroit, Michigan. During his recording career, Washington recorded in the genres of rhythm and blues, rock and roll and Northern soul. While attending Pershing High School, he achieved local hits in 1963 and 1964: "Out of This World" and "Gino Is a Coward". To his credit, he was the first artist signed to Ric-Tic Records. In 1964 he was drafted into the U.S. Army, serving in Japan and South Vietnam; upon return his music career stalled. He hosted his own variety television show in Detroit during the 1970s.

References

External links
[ Allmusic biography by Cub Koda]
BlackCat Rockabilly Europe biography by Dominic Turner

1946 births
American rhythm and blues singers
Rock and roll musicians
American soul singers
Norton Records artists
United States Army soldiers
Living people
Singers from Detroit
Pershing High School alumni
20th-century African-American male singers